Mihai Guriță (born 1 February 1973) is a Romanian former footballer who played as a striker for teams such as: Bucovina Suceava, Foresta Fălticeni, Oțelul Galați and Farul Constanța, among others. After retirement, he was the assistant manager of Foresta Suceava.

External links

1973 births
Living people
People from Suceava County
Romanian footballers
Association football forwards
Liga I players
Liga II players
ASC Oțelul Galați players
FCV Farul Constanța players
FC Steaua București players
FC Gloria Buzău players
ACS Foresta Suceava players